This is an alphabetical list of notable Indian film actresses.

A 

 Aaditi Pohankar
 Aahana Kumra
 Aakanksha Singh
 Aamna Sharif
 Aanchal Munjal
 Aarathi
 Aarti Agarwal
 Aarti Chhabria
 Aashka Goradia
 Abhirami
 Adah Sharma
 Aditi Arya
 Aditi Ravi
 Aditi Sharma
 Aditi Govitrikar
 Aditi Rao Hydari
 Aditi Sarangdhar
 Advani Lakshmi Devi
 Ahaana Krishna
 Ahsaas Channa
 Aimee Baruah
 Aindrita Ray
 Aisha Sharma
 Aishwarya
 Aishwarya Arjun
 Aishwarya Devan
 Aishwarya Nag
 Aishwarya Rai Bachchan
 Aishwarya Rajesh
 Aishwarya Sakhuja
 Akanksha Juneja
 Aksha Pardasany
 Akshara Gowda
 Akshara Haasan
 Akshara Menon
 Alia Bhatt
 Alaya Furniturewala
 Amala Akkineni
 Amala Paul
 Ambika
 Ameeta
 Ameesha Patel
 Amoolya
 Amrita Arora
 Amrita Prakash
 Amrita Puri
 Amrita Rao
 Amrita Raichand
 Amrita Singh
 Amrutha Iyengar
 Amruta Khanvilkar
 Amruta Subhash
 Amyra Dastur
 Amy Jackson
 Anaika Soti
 Ananya
 Ananya Panday
 Ananya Kasaravalli
 Anaswara Kumar
 Anaswara Rajan
 Andrea Jeremiah
 Andria D'Souza
 Anindita Nayar
 Angira Dhar
 Annie
 Anita Hassanandani Reddy
 Anita Guha
 Anita Raj
 Anjala Zhaveri
 Anjali
 Anjali Devi
 Anjali Sudhakar
 Anjana Bhowmick
 Anjana Sukhani
 Anju Mahendru
 Ankita Lokhande
 Ann Augustine
 Ansiba Hassan
 Antara Mali
 Anu Aggarwal
 Anu Prabhakar
 Anu Sithara
 Anupama Parameswaran
 Anupriya Goenka
 Anuradha Mehta
 Anurita Jha
 Anusha Dandekar
 Anushka Ranjan
 Anushka Sen
 Anushka Sharma
 Anushka Shetty
 Anuya Bhagvath
 Anya Singh
 Aparnaa Bajpai
 Aparna Balamurali
 Aparna Sen
 Apoorva Arora
 Archana
 Archana Jose Kavi
 Archana Puran Singh
 Archana Gupta
 Archita Sahu
 Aruna Balraj
 Aruna Irani
 Aruna Shields
 Arundathi Nag
 Asawari Joshi
 Asha Negi
 Asha Bhat
 Asha Parekh
 Asha Saini
 Ashima Bhalla
 Ashnoor Kaur
 Ashwini Bhave
 Ashwini Kalsekar
 Asin Thottumkal
 Athiya Shetty
 Athulya Ravi
 Ayesha Jhulka
 Ayesha Raza
 Ayesha Takia
 Akanksha Puri
 Avani Modi
 Avantika Mishra
 Avneet Kaur
 Auritra Ghosh

B

 Babita
 Barkha Bisht
 Barkha Singh
 Bala Hijam
 Barsha Priyadarshini
 Barsha Rani Bishaya
 Beena Banerjee
 Bhagyashree Patwardhan
 Bhairavi Goswami
 Bhama
 Bhanumathi
 Bhanupriya
 Bharathi Vishnuvardhan
 Bhargavi Narayan
 Bhavana
 Bhavana (actress)
 Bhavana Rao
 Bhavani Prakash
 Bhavya
 Bhoomika Chawla
 Bhumi Pednekar
 Bijoya Ray
 Bianca Desai
 Bidita Bag
 Bindu
 Bindu Madhavi
 Bipasha Basu
 Bina Rai
 Bobby Darling
 Bruna Abdullah
 B. V. Radha

C

 Carol Gracias
 Celina Jaitley
 Chahat Khanna
 Chandrakala
 Chandrika
 Charmila
 Charmy Kaur
 Charu Asopa
 Chaya Singh
 Chetana Das
 Chetna Pande
 Chhavi Mittal
 Chippy
 Chithra
 Chitrangada Singh
 Chitrashi Rawat
 Catherine Tresa
 Claudia Ciesla

D

 Deepti Sati
 Daisy Bopanna
 Daisy Shah
 Daisy Irani
 Debashree Roy
 Deeksha Seth
 Deepa Sahi
 Deepa Sannidhi
 Deepal Shaw
 Deepika Amin
 Deepika Chikhalia
 Deepika Padukone
 Deepti Naval
 Deepti Bhatnagar
 Delnaaz Paul
 Devayani
 Devika
 Devika Rani Roerich
 Dharti Bhatt
 Dia Mirza
 Diana Hayden
 Diana Penty
 Digangana Suryavanshi
 Dimple Jhangiani
 Dimple Kapadia
 Dipannita Sharma
 Disha Parmar
 Disha Patani
 Disha Vakani
 Divya Bharati
 Divya Dutta
 Divya Khosla Kumar
 Divyanka Tripathi
 Drashti Dhami

E

 Elli Avram
 Esha Deol
 Esha Gupta
 Ena Saha
 Eesha Rebba
 Evelyn Sharma
 Elina Samantray
 Erica Fernandes

F

 Farah Naaz
 Farida Jalal
 Fatima Sana Shaikh
 Fatma Begum
 Freida Pinto
 Feryna Wazheir

G

 Gabriela Bertante
 Gajala
 Gauahar Khan
 Gauri Karnik
 Gautami
 Gayathri Raguram
 Gayathrie
 Gayatri
 Gayatri Jayaraman
 Gayatri Joshi
 Gayatri Patel
 Geeta Bali
 Geeta Basra
 Geeta Dutt
 Geetanjali Thapa
 Geetha
 Geetu Mohandas
 Genelia D'Souza
 Girija
 Girija Lokesh
 Girija Shettar
 Giselli Monteiro
 Gopika
 Gowri Pandit
 Gowri Munjal
 Gul Panag
 Gunjan Malhotra

H

 Hansika Motwani
 Harini
 Haripriya
 Harshika Poonacha
 Hasleen Kaur
 Hazel Keech
 Heera Rajagopal
 Helen
 Hema Bellur
 Hema Prabhath
 Hema Malini
 Honey Rose
 Hrishitaa Bhatt
 Huma Qureshi
 Humaima Malik
 Hebah Patel
 Hina Khan
 Hiba Nawab

I

 Ilene Hamann
 Indrani Haldar
 Iniya
 Iravati Harshe
 Isha Chawla
 Isha Sharvani
 Isha Koppikar
 Isha Talwar
 Ishita Dutta
 Ishita Raj Sharma
 Izabelle Leite
 Ileana D'Cruz

J

 Jacqueline Fernandez
 Jannat Zubair Rahmani
 Janhvi Kapoor
 Jasmin Bhasin
 Jayabharathi
 Jayachitra
 J. Jayalalithaa
 Jaya Bachchan
 Jaya Prada
 Jaya Seal
 Jayasudha
 Jayamala
 Jayamalini
 Jennifer Kotwal
 Jennifer Winget
 Jharana Bajracharya
 Jhataleka Malhotra
 Jiya Khan
 Jugnu Ishiqui
 Juhi Chawla
 Juhi Babbar
 Jyothika
 Jonita Gandhi

K

 Kainaat Arora
 Kajal Aggarwal
 Kajal Kiran
 Kajjanbai
 Kajol
 Kalki Koechlin
 Kalpana (Kannada actress)
 Kalpana (Hindi Film actress)
 Kalpana (Malayalam actress)
 Kalpana Iyer
 Kalpana Kartik
 Kalyani Priyadarshan
 Kamini Kaushal
 Kamini Kadam
 Kamalinee Mukherjee
 Kamna Jethmalani
 Kanaka
 Kanakam
 Kanchana
 Kangana Ranaut
 Kanika Subramaniam
 Kareena Kapoor
 Karishma Kapoor
 Karishma Kotak
 Karishma Sharma
 Karishma Tanna
 Karunya Ram
 Karthika Mathew
 Karthika Nair
 Katrina Kaif
 Kashmira Irani
 Kashmira Shah
 Kausalya
 Kaviyoor Ponnamma
 Kavya Madhavan
 Keerthi Bhat
 Keerthi Reddy
 Keerthi Suresh
 Kiara Advani
 Kimi Katkar
 Kimi Verma
 Kim Sharma
 Kim Yashpal
 Kiran Rathod
 Kirron Kher
 Kirat Bhattal
 Kiran Juneja
 Kirti Kulhari
 Kitu Gidwani
 Koel Mallick
 Koel Purie
 Koena Mitra
 Komal
 Komal Jha
 Konkona Sen Sharma
 K. R. Vijaya
 Krishna Kumari
 Kriti Kharbanda
 Kriti Sanon
 Kritika Kamra
 Krystle D'Souza
 Kubbra Sait
 Khushbu Sundar
 Kumari
 Kumkum
 Kuljeet Randhawa
 Kulraj Randhawa
 Kyra Dutt

L

 Laila Mehdin
 Lalita Pawar Zayn
 Lalitha (KPAC)
 Lalitha
 Lara Dutta
 Lakshmi
 Lakshmi Chandrashekar
 Lakshmidevi
 Laxmi Chhaya
 Lakshmi Gopalaswamy
 Lakshmi Manchu
 Lakshmi Menon
 Lakshmi Rai
 Latha
 Lauren Gottlieb
 Lavanya Tripathi
 Laya
 Leela Chitnis
 Leelavathi
 Leena Chandavarkar
 Leena Jumani
 Lekha Washington
 Lena
 Leslie Tripathy
 Lilette Dubey
 Lisa Ray
 Lisa Haydon

M

 Madhavi
 Madhoo (now Madhoo Shah)
 Madhubala
 Madhumitha
 Madhuri Bhattacharya
 Madhuri Dixit
 Madhuri Itagi
 Madhurima Tuli
 Madhuurima
 Madhu Shalini
 Madhura Naik
 Madonna Sebastian
 Mahasweta Ray
 Mahalakshmi
 Mahek Chahal
 Mahie Gill
 Mahika Sharma
 Mahima Chaudhry
 Mahira Khan
 Mahua Roychoudhury
 Mala Sinha
 Malashri
 Malavika
 Malaika Arora
 Malavika Avinash
 Malavika Mohanan
 Malavika Nair
 Malavika Nair
 Malavika Wales
 Mallika Kapoor
 Mallika Sherawat
 Mamta Kulkarni
 Mamta Mohandas
 Mansi Parekh
 Manasvi Mamgai
 Mandakini
 Mandana Karimi
 Mandira Bedi
 Manini Mishra
 Manisha Koirala
 Manjari Phadnis
 Manjima Mohan
 Manju Bhargavi
 Manju Warrier
 Manjula
 Manjula Vijayakumar
 Manorama
 Mantra
 Manushi Chhillar
 Manya
 Manya Pathak
 Masumeh Makhija
 Mawra Hocane
 Mayuri Kango
 Meena
 Meena Kumari
 Meenakshi
 Meenakshi
 Meenakshi Dixit
 Meenakshi Seshadri
 Meera
 Meera Chopra
 Meera Jasmine
 Meera Nandan
 Meera Syal
 Meera Vasudevan
 Mehreen Pirzada
 Megha Akash
 Meghana Gaonkar
 Meghna Naidu
 Meghana Raj
 Meher Vij
 Merle Oberon
 Mia Uyeda
 Minissha Lamba
 Mini Mathur
 Mink Brar
 Mita Vashisht
 Mishti
 Mithila Palkar
 Mithra Kurian
 Moloya Goswami
 Momal Sheikh
 Monalisa
 Mona Singh
 Monali Thakur
 Monica
 Monica Bedi
 Monisha Unni
 Moon Moon Sen
 Mouni Roy
 Moushumi Chatterji
 Mrinal Dev-Kulkarni
 Mrinalini Sharma
 Mrunal Thakur
 Mrunmayee Deshpande
 Mukta Barve
 Mumaith Khan
 Mumtaj
 Mumtaz Shanti
 Mumtaz
 Mumtaz Sorcar
 Mugdha Godse
 Munmun Dutta
 Mugdha Chaphekar
 Muskaan Mihani
 Mynavathi

N

 Nabha Natesh
 Nadira
 Nadiya Moidu
 Nagma
 Nalini
 Nalini Jaywant
 Namrata Shirodkar
 Namrata Thapa
 Namitha
 Namitha Pramod
 Nanda
 Nandana Sen
 Nandita Chandra
 Nandita Swetha
 Nandita Das
 Nargis (Now Nargis Dutt)
 Nargis Fakhri
 Nathalia Kaur
 Nauheed Cyrusi
 Nausheen Sardar Ali
 Navaneet Kaur
 Navneet Kaur Dhillon
 Navya Nair
 Nayanthara
 Nazriya Nazim
 Neelam
 Neelam Verma
 Neelima Azeem
 Neena Gupta
 Neena Kulkarni
 Neha Bamb
 Neha Dhupia
 Neha Hinge
 Neha Khan
 Neha Mahajan
 Neha Oberoi
 Neha Sharma
 Neeru Bajwa
 Neethu
 Neetu Chandra
 Neetu Singh
 Nethra Raghuraman
 Nia Sharma
 Nicolette Bird
 Nidhhi Agerwal
 Nidhi Subbaiah
 Niharika Konidela
 Niharika Singh
 Niharica Raizada
 Nikesha Patel
 Niki Aneja
 Nikita Anand
 Nikita J Palekar
 Nikita Dutta
 Nikita Thukral
 Nikki Galrani
 Meera Chopra (credited as Nila)
 Nimisha Sajayan
 Nimmi
 Nirmala Chennappa
 Nirupa Roy
 Nirmalamma
 Nirosha
 Nisha Agarwal
 Nisha Kothari
 Nisha Ravikrishnan
 Shantipriya (credited as Nishanthi)
 Nishi
 Nishita Goswami
 Nithya Das
 Nithya Menen
 Nivedita Jain
 Nivedita Joshi Saraf
 Nivetha Thomas
 Nivetha Pethuraj
 Noor Jehan
 Nora Fatehi
 Nutan
 Nimrat Kaur
 Nushrat Bharucha
 Nathalia Kaur
 Nyla Usha

O

 Oviya Helen

P

 Padmapriya
 Padma Khanna
 Padma Kumta
 Padma Lakshmi
 Padma Vasanthi
 Padmaja Rao
 Padmini Kolhapure
 Padmini
 Padmavati Rao
 Pallavi Joshi
 Pallavi Kulkarni
 Pallavi Subhash
 Pallavi Sharda
 Panchi Bora
 Pandari Bai
 Pankhuri Awasthy
 Pakhi Tyrewala
 Paoli Dam
 Parineeti Chopra
 Parminder Nagra
 Parul Chauhan
 Parul Gulati
 Parul Yadav
 Parvathy Jayaram
 Parvathy Nair
 Parvathy Omanakuttan
 Parvati Melton
 Parvathy Thiruvothu
 Parveen Babi
 Patience Cooper
 Patralekha
 Payal Rohatgi
 Payel Sarkar
 Payal Ghosh
 Perizaad Zorabian
 Pia Bajpai
 Plabita Borthakur
 Pooja Batra
 Pooja Bedi
 Pooja Bhatt
 Pooja Chopra
 Pooja Gandhi
 Pooja Gor
 Pooja Hegde
 Pooja Kanwal
 Pooja Lokesh
 Pooja Sawant
 Pooja Umashankar
 Poonam Bajwa
 Poonam Dhillon
 Poonam Kaur
 Poonam Pandey
 Poornima Bhagyaraj
 Prayaga Martin
 Prachi Desai
 Prachi Shah
 Pramila Joshai
 Pratibha Sinha
 Pranitha Subhash
 Pranutan Bahl
 Prarthana Behere
 Prastuti Parashar
 Preetha Vijayakumar
 Preeti Jhangiani
 Preity Zinta
 Prema
 Prema Narayan
 Priti Sapru
 Priya Anand
 Priya Bapat
 Priya Gill
 Priya Lal
 Priya Raman
 Priya Rajvansh
 Priya Bhavani Shankar
 Priya Wal
 Priyamani
 Priyanka Bassi
 Priyanka Chopra Jonas
 Priyanka Arul Mohan
 Priyanka Nair
 Priyanka Trivedi
 Preetika Rao
 Puja Gupta
 Puja Banerjee
 Purbi Joshi

R

 Raakhee (Now Raakhi Gulzar)
 Radhika Apte
 Radhika Madan
 Raadhika Sarathkumar
 Rachana Narayanankutty
 Rachna Banerjee
 Radha
 Radha Saluja
 Radhika Chaudhari
 Radhika Kumaraswamy
 Radhika Pandit
 Ragini Travancore Sisters
 Ragini Dwivedi
 Ragini Khanna
 Raima Sen
 Rajisha Vijayan
 Rajshree
 Rajshri Deshpande
 Rakhi Sawant
 Rakul Preet Singh
 Rakshita
 Raashi Khanna
 Rambha
 Rameshwari
 Ranjeeta Kaur
 Ranjitha
 Rajini
 Rani Mukerji
 Ramya (born Divya Spandana)
 Ramya Barna
 Ramya Krishnan
 Ramya Sri
 Ramya Nambaseean
 Rashi Khanna
 Rashi Mal
 Rashmi
 Rashmi Desai
 Rashmi Gautam
 Rashmika Mandanna 
 Ratan Rajput
 Rati Agnihotri
 Rati Pandey
 Ratna Pathak Shah
 Raveena Tandon
 Reena Roy
 Reema Lagoo
 Reema Sen
 Regina Cassandra
 Rekha
 Rekha, also known as Josephine
 Rekha Das
 Rekha Rana
 Rekha Vedavyas
 Reenu Mathews
 Renuka Menon
 Renukamma Murugodu
 Renuka Shahane
 Revathi
 Rhea Chakraborty
 Richa Ahuja
 Richa Chaddha
 Richa Gangopadhyay
 Richa Pallod
 Richa Panai
 Richa Sharma
 Ridhi Dogra
 Rima Kallingal
 Rimi Sen
 Rimi Tomy
 Rinke Khanna
 Rinku Rajguru
 Rita Bhaduri
 Ritika Singh
 Rituparna Sengupta
 Riya Sen
 Rohini Hattangadi
 Rohini
 Roja
 Roja Ramani
 Roma
 Roopa Ganguly
 Roopa Iyer
 Roshni Chopra
 R.T. Rama
 Ruby Parihar
 Rucha Gujarathi
 Rupini
 Ranjana Deshmukh

S

 Sabitri Chatterjee
 Saba Qamar
 Saba Azad
 Shivaleeka Oberoi
 Sobhita Dhulipala
 S. Varalakshmi
 Sadha
 Sadhana Shivdasani
 Sagarika Ghatge
 Sagarika Mukherjee
 Sajal Aly
 Sana Althaf
 Sana Makbul
 Sandhya
 Sai Lokur
 Saiyami Kher
 Samskruthy Shenoy 
 Samyuktha Hegde 
 Sandeepa Dhar
 Sandhya
 Sandhya Mridul
 Sandhya Roy
 Sanaya Irani
 Sanya Malhotra
 Saniya Anklesaria
 Sanjeeda Sheikh
 Sakshi Shivanand
 Sakshi Tanwar
 Sai Pallavi
 Sai Tamhankar
 Saira Banu
 Salma Agha
 Saloni Aswani
 Samantha Ruth Prabhu
 Samiksha
 Sameera Reddy
 Samvrutha Sunil
 Sana Amin Sheikh
 Sana Khan
 Sana Saeed
 Sanchita Padukone
 Sandeepa Dhar
 Sangeeta Bijlani
 Sandra Amy
 Sanober Kabir
 Sandali Sinha
 Sanghavi
 Sanjjanaa
 Sanjana Gandhi (now Pooja Gandhi)
 Santoshi
 Sara Ali Khan
 Sarah Jane Dias
 Sara Loren
 Saranya Mohan
 Saranya Ponvannan
 Sarayu (actress)
 Sarika
 Saritha
 Saroja Devi
 Satarupa Pyne
 Sathyabhama
 Saumya Tandon
 Savitri
 Sayali Bhagat
 Sayani Gupta
 Sayyeshaa Saigal
 Seerat Kapoor
 Seema Biswas
 Seema Pahwa
 Seema Shinde
 Seetha
 Shabana Azmi
 Shalini (Baby Shalini)
 Shamili (Baby Shamili)
 Shahana Goswami
 Sakshi Tanwar
 Sharmila Mandre
 Sharmilee
 Shibani Dandekar
 Shreya Narayan
 Shakeela
 Shalini Pandey
 Shamita Shetty
 Shanthamma
 Shantipriya (also Nishanthi)
 Sharmila Tagore
 Shashikala
 Shazahn Padamsee
 Sheeba Chadha
 Sheela
 Sheela
 Sheena Bajaj
 Sheena Chohan
 Sheena Shahabadi
 Shenaz Treasurywala
 Sherin
 Sherlyn Chopra (Mona Chopra)
 Shilpa Shetty
 Shilpa Shukla
 Shilpa Shirodkar
 Shilpa Tulaskar
 Shilpa Anand
 Shilpi Sharma
 Shivani Raghuvanshi
 Shivangi Khedkar
 Shivangi Joshi
 Shreya Dhanwanthary
 Shruti Naidu
 Shylaja Nag
 Shweta Basu Prasad
 Shweta Bhardwaj
 Shweta Menon
 Shweta Gulati
 Shweta Tiwari 
 Shweta Tripathi
 Shobhana
 Shobhna Samarth
 Shraddha Arya
 Shraddha Das
 Shraddha Kapoor
 Shraddha Srinath
 Shruthi Haasan
 Shruti Sodhi
 Shruti
 Shruti Seth
 Shruti Sharma
 Shritha Sivadas
 Shriya Saran
 Shriya Pilgaonkar
 Shriya Sharma
 Shubha Poonja
 Shyama (Khurshid Akhtar)
 Shylashri
 Sihi Kahi Geetha
 Sija Rose
 Simi Garewal
 Simone Singh
 Simple Kapadia
 Simple Kaur
 Simran Mundi
 Simran Bagga
 Sindhu
 Sindhu Tolani
 Sindhu Menon
 Silk Smitha
 Sithara
 Smita Patil
 Smriti Irani (Smriti Malhotra)
 Smriti Kalra
 Sneha Ullal
 Sneha
 Snigdha Akolkar
 Soha Ali Khan
 Sonakshi Sinha
 Sonali Bendre
 Sonali Kulkarni
 Sonali Raut
 Sonalee Kulkarni
 Sonal Chauhan
 Sonam (actress)
 Sonam Bajwa
 Sonam Kapoor
 Sonalika Joshi
 Sonarika Bhadoria
 Sonia Agarwal
 Sonnalli Seygall
 Sonu
 Sonu Walia
 Sophia Chaudhary
 Soundarya
 Sowcar Janaki
 Spruha Joshi
 Srabanti Chatterjee
 Sridevi (Now Sridevi Kapoor)
 Sriti Jha
 Sri Divya
 Srividya
 Sripriya
 Subbulakshmi
 Subhashri
 Suchitra
 Suchitra Krishnamurthy
 Suchitra Pillai
 Suchitra Sen
 Sunitha / Vidhyasri
 Sudha Belawadi
 Sudha Chandran
 Sudha Rani
 Sudha Narasimharaju
 Sudipta Chakraborty
 Suhasi Goradia Dhami
 Suhasini
 Sujatha
 Sukirti Kandpal
 Sukumari
 Sulakshana Pandit
 Sulochana Devi
 Sumalatha
 Suman Nagarkar
 Suman Ranganathan
 Sumithra
 Sumitra Devi
 Sunaina
 Sunny Leone
 Surbhi Chandna
 Surbhi Jyoti
 Supriya Devi
 Supriya Pathak
 Supriya Pilgaonkar
 Supriya Shukla
 Suraiya
 Surveen Chawla
 Suryakantham
 Sushma Reddy
 Sushmita Sen
 Sumalatha
 Suvalakshmi
 Swati Reddy
 Swapna
 Swaroop Sampat
 Swastika Mukherjee
 Srinidhi Shetty
 Swara Bhaskar
 Suzanna Mukherjee

T

 Tabu
 Tahira Kochhar
 Tanaaz Irani
 Tanisha
 Tanushree Dutta
 Tanuja
 Tanu Roy
 Tanvi Azmi
 Tamannaah Bhatia
 Tannishtha Chatterjee
 Taapsee Pannu
 Tara
 Tara Anuradha
 Tara Deshpande
 Tara D'Souza
 Tara Sharma
 Tarana Raja
 Taruni Sachdev
 Tejaswi Madivada
 Tena Desae
 Tia Bajpai
 Tillotama Shome
 Tina Munim (now Tina Ambani)
 Tina Dutta
 Tisca Chopra
 Tripuramba
 Trisha Krishnan
 Tulip Joshi
 Tun Tun
 Twinkle Khanna
 Tara Alisha Berry
 Tara Sutaria

U

 Udhayathara
 Udaya Chandrika
 Udita Goswami
 Ujjwala Raut
 Uma
 Uma Padmanabhan
 Umasashi
 Umashree
 Usha Chavan
 Urmila Matondkar
 Urmila Kanitkar
 Urvashi
 Urvashi Dholakia
 Urvashi Sharma
 Usha Kiran
 Usha Nadkarni
 Usha Naik
 Ulka Gupta
 Upasna Singh
 Urvashi Rautela

V

 Vaani Kapoor
 Vanitha Vijayakumar
 Vadivukkarasi
 Vaidehi Parashurami
 Vaishali Desai
 Vaishali Kasaravalli
 Vandana Gupte
 Vanishree
 Vanisri
 Vani Bhojan
 Vani Viswanath
 Vanitha Vasu
 Vaishnavi Mahant
 Vrushika Mehta
 Varalaxmi Sarathkumar
 Varsha Bollamma
 Varsha Usgaonkar
 Vasundhara Das
 Vedhika
 Veda Sastry
 Veena Malik
 Veena Sundar
 Veena
 Vega Tamotia
 Vibha Chibber
 Vidhubala
 Vidya Balan
 Vithika Sheru
 Vidya Malvade
 Vidya Sinha
 Vishakha Singh
 Vijeta Pandit
 Vijayalakshmi
 Vijayalakshmi Singh
 Vijayashanti
 Vimala Raman
 Vinaya Prasad
 Vyjayantimala

W

 Waheeda Rehman
 Wamiqa Gabbi
 Warina Hussain
 Waluscha De Sousa

Y

 Yagna Shetty
 Yami Gautam
 Yamuna (actress)
 Yashaswini Dayama
 Yogeeta Bali
 Yana Gupta
 Yukta Mookhey
 Yuvika Chaudhary

Z

 Zaheera
 Zaira Wasim
 Zarina Wahab
 Zarine Khan
 Zoya Afroz
 Zoa Morani
 Zeenat Aman
 Zoya Khan
 Zubeida
 Zaheeda

See also

 List of Hindi film actresses
 List of Tamil film actresses 
 List of Kannada film actresses
 List of Punjabi cinema actresses
 List of Indian television actresses
 List of Indian film actors
 List of Hindi film actors
 Lists of actresses

References

 
film